Frank J. Farrell (c. 1866 – February 10, 1926) was an American baseball executive. He and William S. Devery were the first owners of the New York Highlanders (now New York Yankees). They purchased the Baltimore Orioles on  January 9, 1903 for $18,000 and moved it to New York City.

Biography
He was born around 1866. Farrell was involved in New York City gambling, and owned pool halls and a casino. At one time he was the partner of William Burbridge.

In 1912 he fired Harry Wolverton as the manager of the Yankees. On January 29, 1915 Farrell and Devery sold the Yankees to Jacob Ruppert and Tillinghast L'Hommedieu Huston for $460,000.

Farrell died in Atlantic City, New Jersey, of a heart attack, after recovering from a bout of bronchitis.

See also
New York Yankees managers and ownership

References

1866 births
1926 deaths
Major League Baseball owners
New York Yankees owners
American racehorse owners and breeders